Hudcovce is a village and municipality in Humenné District in the Prešov Region of north-east Slovakia.

History
In historical records the village was first mentioned in 1467.

Geography
The municipality lies at an altitude of 140 metres and covers an area of 5.864 km².
It has a population of about 420 people.

References

External links
 
 

Villages and municipalities in Humenné District
Zemplín (region)